Beaver Creek is a  long 2nd order tributary to Reedy Fork, in Guilford County, North Carolina.

Course
Beaver Creek rises in Forsyth County on the divide between Beaver Creek and East Belews Creek (Dan River).  Beaver Creek then flows northeast into Guilford County to meet the Haw River about 3 miles east-southeast of Oak Ridge, North Carolina.

Watershed
Beaver Creek drains  of area, receives about 45.2 in/year of precipitation, has a wetness index of 409.13 and is about 35% forested.

References

Rivers of North Carolina
Rivers of Forsyth County, North Carolina
Rivers of Guilford County, North Carolina